The men's singles table tennis event was part of the table tennis programme and took place between December 20 and 21, at the Wunna Theikdi Indoor Stadium, Naypyidaw, Myanmar.

Schedule
All times are Myanmar Standard Time (UTC+06:30)

Results

Preliminary round

Group A

Group B

Group C

Group D

Knockout round

References

Table tennis at the 2013 Southeast Asian Games